The 2019 season was Molde's 12th consecutive year in Eliteserien, and their 43rd season in the top flight of Norwegian football. They participated in Eliteserien, winning the title for the 4th time, reached the third round of the Cup and were knocked out of the 2019–20 UEFA Europa League in the playoff round by FK Partizan after entering at the First qualifying round stage. Molde were scheduled to take part in the 2019 Mesterfinalen against Rosenborg, but the match was cancelled 15 March 2019 due to heavy rain.

Season events
On 19 December 2018, Molde announced that manager Ole Gunnar Solskjær had been "loaned" to Manchester United as their caretaker manager until the end of the 2018–19 season, Erling Moe taking charge of Molde during this period. On 28 March 2019, Manchester United announced the permanent appointment of Solskjær as their manager. On 16 June, in Molde's won 2–0 home win against Ranheim, the club scored for a 29th consecutive league games, breaking the club record of scoring in 28 consecutive league matches from the 2014 season. Molde were eliminated from the Norwegian Cup on 19 June, after being defeated 0–4 away to Aalesund in the third round. The record goalscoring run of scoring in 40 consecutive league games ended on 6 October with a goalless draw against Brann at Brann Stadion. On 10 November 2019, Molde won the league title with two games to spare after Strømsgodset were defeated with the score 4–0.

Norwegian Cup
Molde entered the Norwegian Cup in the first round. The first round schedule was announced on 11 April and paired Molde with fifth tier side Eide/Omegn. Molde won the match 5–0; Leke James opened the scoring in the 10th minute, and Eirik Ulland Andersen scored Molde's second goal. James scored his second, Molde's third, and Ulland Andersen completed his first hat-trick for Molde with two goals in the second half, the first from the penalty spot. Late in the game, Ulland Andersen was removed from the pitch with an injury to his Achilles tendon, which possibly rules him out for the rest of the season. Goalkeeper Álex Craninx and midfielder Emil Breivik (substitute) got their debut for the club against Eide/Omegn. On 6 May, it was announced that Sunndal from 3. divisjon, whom they last met in the first round seven seasons earlier, when they won 4–0, were Molde's opponent in the second round. The result was the same on this occasion; Christoffer Remmer scored his first goal in his senior career early in the game, before James scored his third goal of the Norwegian Cup season. 17-year-old winger Jakob Ørsahl made his Molde debut and scored both the third and fourth goal. Under–19 players Tobias Hestad, Markus Eiane and Oliver Petersen were all brought on to their club debut in the second half. NFF paired Molde with local rivals Aalesund in the third round. On 19 June, Molde were knocked out of the Norwegian Cup after a 0–4 defeat away to second tier side Aalesund. Molde's captain Ruben Gabrielsen was sent off about half an hour into the game on the score 0–2.

Squad

Transfers

In

 Knudtzon's move was announced on 17 July 2018 and finalised on 1 January 2019.

Out

 Haaland's move was announced on 18 August 2018 and finalised on 1 January 2019.

Loans out

Released

Friendlies

Competitions

Mesterfinalen

Eliteserien

Results summary

Results by match

Results

Table

Norwegian Cup

Europa League

Qualifying rounds

Squad statistics

Appearances and goals

|-
|colspan="14"|Players away from Molde on loan:

|-
|colspan="14"|Players who appeared for Molde no longer at the club:

|}

Goalscorers

Clean sheets

Disciplinary record

See also
Molde FK seasons

References

2019
Molde
Molde
Norwegian football championship-winning seasons